Don Matteo is an Italian television series.

Season 1 (2000)

Season 2 (2001)

Season 3 (2002)

Season 4 (2004)

Season 5 (2006)

Season 6 (2008)

Season 7 (2009)

Season 8 (2011)

Season 9 (2014)

Season 10 (2016)

Season 11 (2018)

Season 12 (2020)

References

Lists of crime television series episodes
Lists of Italian television series episodes